Stehlin is a surname. Notable persons by this name include:

Benoist Stehlin (c.1732–1774), French harpsichord builder
Hans Georg Stehlin (1870–1941), Swiss paleontologist and geologist
Johann Jakob Stehlin (1803–1879), Swiss politician 
Karl Rudolf Stehlin (1831–1881), Swiss politician and President of the Swiss Council of States
Andrew Stehlin, New Zealand actor